LaSalle Parish (French: Paroisse de La Salle) is a parish located in the U.S. state of Louisiana. As of the 2020 United States Census, the population was 14,791. The parish seat is Jena. The parish was created in 1910 from the western section of Catahoula Parish and named for René-Robert Cavelier, Sieur de La Salle. 

There is some confusion as to whether the parish is spelled "LaSalle" (no space) or "La Salle." An example of the latter view can be seen in the photo at right of the sign over the entrance to a "La Salle Parish Courthouse." A photo of this sign is also featured on the main webpage of the LaSalle Parish Clerk of Court, but the parish is consistently spelled "LaSalle" (no space) in the website text. The prevailing spelling of the parish is "LaSalle" (no space), consistent with the U.S. Census since 2011, and as demonstrated for example by a Google Trends comparison of the phrase's different spellings.

Geography

Major highways
  U.S. Highway 84
  U.S. Highway 165
  Louisiana Highway 8
  Louisiana Highway 28

Adjacent parishes
 Caldwell Parish  (north)
 Catahoula Parish  (east)
 Avoyelles Parish  (south)
 Rapides Parish  (southwest)
 Grant Parish  (west)
 Winn Parish  (northwest)

National protected area
 Catahoula National Wildlife Refuge (part)

Demographics

2020 census

As of the 2020 United States census, there were 14,791 people, 4,814 households, and 3,643 families residing in the parish.

2000 census
As of the census of 2000, there were 14,282 people, 5,291 households, and 3,798 families residing in the parish.  The population density was 23 people per square mile (9/km2).  There were 6,273 housing units at an average density of 10 per square mile (4/km2).  The racial makeup of the parish was 86.13% White, 12.20% Black or African American, 0.64% Native American, 0.18% Asian, 0.01% Pacific Islander, 0.20% from other races, and 0.64% from two or more races.  0.82% of the population were Hispanic or Latino of any race.

There were 5,291 households, out of which 33.60% had children under the age of 18 living with them, 59.00% were married couples living together, 9.80% had a female householder with no husband present, and 28.20% were non-families. 25.70% of all households were made up of individuals, and 13.00% had someone living alone who was 65 years of age or older.  The average household size was 2.52 and the average family size was 3.03.

In the parish the population was spread out, with 26.10% under the age of 18, 9.40% from 18 to 24, 27.20% from 25 to 44, 22.60% from 45 to 64, and 14.80% who were 65 years of age or older.  The median age was 36 years. For every 100 females there were 100.30 males.  For every 100 females age 18 and over, there were 97.20 males.

The median income for a household in the parish was $28,189, and the median income for a family was $36,197. Males had a median income of $27,431 versus $19,697 for females. The per capita income for the parish was $14,033.  About 14.90% of families and 18.70% of the population were below the poverty line, including 23.70% of those under age 18 and 18.90% of those age 65 or over.

National Guard
The 1087TH Transportation Company of the 165TH CSS (combat service support) Battalion of the 139TH RSG (regional support group) resides in Jena, Louisiana.

Communities

Towns
 Jena
 Olla
 Tullos
 Urania

Unincorporated areas

Census-designated place 
 Good Pine
 Midway

Other unincorporated communities 
 Standard
 Summerville
 Trout

Notable people
 Evelyn Blackmon, born in Standard in 1924; Democratic member of the Louisiana House of Representatives from 1984 to 1988 from West Monroe; Realtor for a half century
 Thomas "Bud" Brady, member of the Louisiana House of Representatives from 1976 to 1988
 U. T. Downs, sheriff of Rapides Parish, 1924–1940; mayor of Pineville, 1914–1924, born in LaSalle Parish in 1880
 Mike Francis, former Louisiana Republican state chairman
 Henry E. Hardtner, lumberman known as "Louisiana's first conservationist", member of both houses of the Louisiana State Legislature, LaSalle Parish police juror, founder of Urania
 Speedy O. Long, state senator, U.S. representative, district attorney
 Jeffery Simmons, Football player for the Tennessee Titans

Politics
LaSalle Parish has been staunchly Republican since 1956, except in 1968 when it voted strongly for American Independent nominee George Wallace. Prior to that, it had been heavily Democratic, and no Democratic nominee since 1956 besides Jimmy Carter and Bill Clinton has come within ten points of winning the parish.

See also

 National Register of Historic Places listings in LaSalle Parish, Louisiana

References

External links
 State Website Profile
 LaSalle Parish Clerk of Court
 LaSalle Parish Sheriff's Office

Louisiana parishes
 
1910 establishments in Louisiana
Populated places established in 1910